Cyrtocarcinus truncatus is a species of crab in the family Xanthidae that lives in the waters around Hawaii. It was described in 1906 by Mary J. Rathbun as Harrovia truncata, based on a single immature male specimen caught near Kauai. Masatsune Takeda transferred the species to his new genus Glyptocarcinus in 1979, and Peter Ng and Diana Chia erected a new genus, Cyrtocarcinus, for this species alone, in 1994.

References

Xanthoidea
Crustaceans of Hawaii
Monotypic decapod genera